"Changes" is the first single taken from Gareth Gates' third studio album, Pictures of the Other Side. It was released on 9 April 2007 and was his first commercial single since "Say It Isn't So" in 2003. The single charted at No. 14 on the UK Singles Chart but the following week dropped out of the top 40, breaking his streak of top ten hits.

The music video for "Changes" is directed by Andy Hylton.

Track listing
CD
"Changes"
"Lovesong"

Download
"Changes" (Edit)
"Changes"
"Lovesong"
"Changes" (Acoustic)

Music Reviews
In the chart commentary in Yahoo Music UK & Ireland by James Masterton, he rated that "Changes" is a fascinating single certainly.

Notes

2007 singles
Gareth Gates songs
Songs written by Sacha Skarbek
Songs written by Martin Terefe
2007 songs